Grant Township is a township in Kossuth County, Iowa, United States.

History
Grant Township was established in 1894. It was the last township created in Kossuth County.

References

Townships in Kossuth County, Iowa
Townships in Iowa
1894 establishments in Iowa
Populated places established in 1894